David Thomson Ellis (10 April 1869 – 29 January 1940) was a Scottish footballer who played as a centre-forward and made one appearance for the Scotland national team.

Club career
Ellis played for Mossend Swifts in the early 1890s, but also featured in a friendly match for Heart of Midlothian on 1 March 1890. He joined Heart of Midlothian in the second half of the 1891–92 season, where he played until the end of the following season, making fourteen appearances and scoring two goals for the club in the Scottish Football League. Ellis also featured for Celtic as a guest player in a friendly against Nottingham Forest on 4 April 1892.

International career
Ellis earned his first and only cap for Scotland on 19 March 1892 in the 1891–92 British Home Championship against Ireland in Belfast. He scored Scotland's third goal of the match in the 70th minute, extending their lead to 3–1, with the match ultimately finishing as a 3–2 win.

Personal life
Ellis was born on 10 April 1869 in West Calder. His brother James was also a footballer, and played alongside David at Mossend Swifts. As a result, some sources erroneously attributed the national team cap against Ireland to James. Ellis was married to Elizabeth Kennady, and died on 29 January 1940 in Edinburgh at the age of 70.

Career statistics

Club

International

International goals

References

1869 births
1940 deaths
Footballers from West Lothian
Scottish footballers
Scotland international footballers
Association football forwards
Heart of Midlothian F.C. players
Mossend Swifts F.C. players
Scottish Football League players
People from West Calder